Khalid Radhy (born 5 December 1981) is a Saudi Arabian professional footballer who plays as a goalkeeper for Saudi Arabian club Al-Sharq.

He started out his career at Al-Riyadh, before joining Al-Nassr in 2006 where he spent 7 years mainly being the backup goalkeeper. In 2013, he transferred to Al-Faisaly and spent one year before joining Al-Hazm, where he again spent one year. In the summer of 2015, he joined Hajer and spent two years, before signing an extension keeping him at the club for a further year.

References

kooora.com - Arabic

1981 births
Living people
Sportspeople from Riyadh
Al Nassr FC players
Association football goalkeepers
Saudi Arabian footballers
Al-Riyadh SC players
Hajer FC players
Al-Faisaly FC players
Al-Hazem F.C. players
Al-Sadd FC (Saudi football club) players
Al-Sharq Club players
Saudi First Division League players
Saudi Professional League players
Saudi Second Division players